The Amatlan chub (Yuriria amatlana) is a cyprinid fish endemic to the Ameca River basin in Mexico.

References

Yuriria (fish)
Fish described in 2007